Belsand Assembly constituency is an assembly constituency in shiwhar district in the Indian state of Bihar.

Overview
As per Delimitation of Parliamentary and Assembly constituencies Order, 2008, 30. Belsand Assembly constituency is composed of the following: Belsand and Parsauni community development blocks in Sitamarhi district and Tariani Chowk CD Block in Sheohar district.

Belsand Assembly constituency is part of 4. Sheohar (Lok Sabha constituency).

Members of Legislative Assembly

Election results

2020

References

External links
 

Assembly constituencies of Bihar
Politics of Sitamarhi district